Navad (meaning ninety - 90 min.) was an Iranian, Persian language, popular weekly television programme broadcast by Channel 3 in Iran and hosted by Adel Ferdosipour. The program focused on the football matches played in the Persian Gulf Pro League every week.

Every episode typically featured two guests, one who analyzed the technical aspects of the matches, and  the other discussed the referee's decisions and errors. On some shows, famous football players were invited and interviewed as well. (Analyzor has currently replaced by an analyze segment)
Navad show contained segments like "With the Legionnaires" (reporting on the Iranian footballers playing abroad), "Navad News" (the latest news about football in Iran) and polls (sometimes prediction of the upcoming matches) which could be contributed via SMS or Navad official app on iOS and Android.

Since 2015–16 series, the analyze team of the program, scores the players of Persian Gulf Pro League each week and overall, on the style of Kicker, from 1.00 (best) to 6.00 (worst).

Starting 2016–17 series, Navad website launched a football manager online game using live stats of the players contributing in the Iran Pro League, entitled Football Fantasy.

References

External links
  Official Website
  Full Archive of 'Navad'

Iranian television shows
Association football television series
2000s Iranian television series
1999 Iranian television series debuts
1990s Iranian television series
2010s Iranian television series
Islamic Republic of Iran Broadcasting original programming
Persian-language television shows
Criticism of sports